Denning Manufacturing is an Australian bus manufacturer in Acacia Ridge, Brisbane, Australia. In September 2019, it was acquired by Custom Bus, but its branding and operations will be retained.

Current Operations
Denning Manufacturing was formed in 2004 in a take-over of Alan B Denning's manufacturing plant.  It manufacturers integral buses and coaches (chassis and body) as well as chassis for bodying by other manufacturers with Caterpillar or Cummins engines.

History

Denning

Denning commenced bodying buses in Brisbane in 1958.  Denning's first integral bus (both chassis and body), the Monocoach, was launched in 1966.  Along with the later Denair and Landseer, it would become the dominant long-distance coach in Australia.

In 1968, Denning was sold to Leyland Australia.  Between 1968 and 1970 it bodied 136 Leyland Panthers for the Brisbane City Council.

In 1970, a plant was opened in Beverley, South Australia to body 292 AEC Swift 691s for the Municipal Tramways Trust in Adelaide.  Some monocoaches were built there before the plant closed in August 1974.  In 1979, Denning coaches began to be assembled under licence in New Zealand by the Mount Cook Group.

In December 1988, Leyland Australia (by now renamed JRA Limited) purchased Denning's biggest competitor in the coach market, Austral from AP Group. Both continued to operate separately until 1990 when the Denning plant in Acacia Ridge was closed and production transferred to the Austral facility in Geebung.

Alan B Denning Co.

The Alan B Denning Co. commenced operations supplying body kits for buses assembled in Asia, primarily on Mercedes-Benz chassis in 1994.  In February 1995 it began bodying buses and coaches for Australian operators.  The company was placed in administration in November 2003 with the plant subsequently being purchased by Denning Manufacturing. The business was successfully operated up until its sale to the Dunn Group, in 2019.

References

External links
Bus Australia gallery
Custom Denning

Bus manufacturers of Australia
Manufacturing companies based in Brisbane
1958 establishments in Australia